, provisional designation , is a kilometer-sized asteroid, classified as a near-Earth object, Mars-crosser and potentially hazardous asteroid of the Apollo group.

Description 

Three months after its discovery on 6 December 1997 by James V. Scotti of the University of Arizona's Spacewatch Project, the asteroid was predicted to make an exceptionally close approach to Earth on 28 October 2028. During the close approach, the asteroid should peak at about apparent magnitude 8.2, and will be visible in binoculars.

 measures between 0.7 and 1.4 kilometers in diameter.

This asteroid also regularly comes near the large asteroid Pallas.

IAU Circular 

On 11 March 1998, using a three-month observation arc, a faulty International Astronomical Union circular and press information sheet were put out that incorrectly concluded "that the asteroid was 'virtually certain' to pass within 80% of the distance to the Moon and stood a 'small...not entirely out of the question' possibility of hitting the Earth in 2028." But by 23 December 1997, it should have been clear that XF11 had no reasonable possibility of an Earth impact. Within hours of the announcement, independent calculations by Paul Chodas, Don Yeomans, and Karri Muinonen had calculated that the probability of Earth impact was essentially zero, and vastly less than the probability of impact from as-yet-undiscovered asteroids. Chodas (1999) concurs with Marsden (1999) that based on the 1997 data alone there was about 1 chance in a hundred thousand that XF11 could have been on an Earth-impact trajectory—that is, until the 1990 precovery observations eliminated such possibilities. During the October 2002 close approach, the asteroid was observed by the 70-meter Goldstone radar dish, further refining the orbit.

References

External links 
  at the European Asteroid Research Node (E.A.R.N)
 Brian Marsden: : the true story (Archived from the original )
 Spacewatch animation of 
 Asteroid  (Earth Close-Approach), JPL Near-Earth Object Program
 
 
 

035396
035396
035396
035396
19971206